Thomas Scott Cadden (December 2, 1923 – November 2, 2007) was a pioneering television commercial producer, director, writer, and songwriter during the 1950s, 1960s, and 1970s. He is best known for composing the famous Mr. Clean advertising jingle written in 1957 for use with the product's introduction in 1958. He produced, directed and wrote the Mr. Clean commercials until the 1970s. The Mr. Clean jingle is still used today in a more contemporary arrangement.

Other Cadden highlights were commercials written for Curad adhesive bandages, Pringles potato snacks, Head & Shoulders anti-dandruff shampoo, and Alka Seltzer, and scores of other commercials and jingles.  Cadden was a part of a Chicago trio of jingle writers featuring Bill Walker and Dick Marx (father of singer/songwriter Richard Marx).

Cadden was born in Baxter Springs, Kansas, in 1923. He learned to play the piano at a very early age.  In 1941 he attended the University of Kansas, but his college was interrupted by World War II military service in Europe and the Pacific from 1942 to 1946. Cadden returned to the University to finish his degree in journalism.  Cadden was initiated into Kappa Tau Alpha Journalism Society in 1977. He was also a very active member of the Kansas Alpha Phi Kappa Psi fraternity in Lawrence, Kansas.  Cadden retired from advertising in the 1980s and wrote What a Bunch of Characters, a book on fifty film actors. In the 1990s and early 2000s Cadden would make special appearances as a guest of Procter & Gamble during Mr. Clean advertising promotions.  Thomas Scott Cadden passed in Glenview, Illinois, of complications from pneumonia.

References
 Jensen, Trevor, and an unnamed reporter; “Thomas Scott Cadden: 1923 - 2007, Ad man wrote Mr. Clean jingle”,  the Chicago Tribune'''', 7 November 2007.
 anonymous; Obituaries: “Thomas Scott Cadden  1923 - 2007 Glenview, Ill.”, the Lawrence Journal-World.
 Cadden, Thomas Scott; What a Bunch of Characters: an Entertaining Guide to Who Played What in the Movie'' (1984), .

1923 births
2007 deaths
American advertising people
Jingle writers
University of Kansas alumni
People from Baxter Springs, Kansas